Hussam Abdul Rahman (born 25 May 1954) is a Jordanian shooter. He competed in the 1984 Summer Olympics.

References

1954 births
Living people
Shooters at the 1984 Summer Olympics
Jordanian male sport shooters
Olympic shooters of Jordan
20th-century Jordanian people